Amana erythronioides (formerly Tulipa erythronioides) is an East Asian species of flowering plant in the lily family, native to China (Anhui, Zhejiang) and Japan (Musashi, Ise).

Amana erythronioides is a bulb-forming perennial up to 20 cm tall. Flowers are white with purple veins.

References

External links
Plantphoto China, 二叶郁金香 Tulipa erythronioides photos with captions in Chinese
ヒロハノアマナ　　広葉の甘菜, ヒロハアマナ  阔叶老鸦瓣 kuo ye lao ya ban, Amana erythronioides  photos with text in Japanese

Liliaceae
Flora of China
Flora of Eastern Asia
Plants described in 1875